Jeffries House may refer to:

Jeffries House (North Little Rock, Arkansas), listed on the National Register of Historic Places in Pulaski County, Arkansas
 Capt. Harold B. Jeffries House, Zephyrhills, Florida, listed on the National Register of Historic Places
Augustine Hansell House, also known as Jeffries House, a historic house in Thomasville, Georgia